Bernd Wakolbinger (born 2 February 1976) is an Austrian lightweight rower. He won a gold medal at the 2001 World Rowing Championships in Lucerne with the lightweight men's four.

References

1976 births
Living people
Austrian male rowers
World Rowing Championships medalists for Austria
Olympic rowers of Austria
Rowers at the 2000 Summer Olympics
Rowers at the 2004 Summer Olympics